Anna Woolhouse (born in 1984) is a British sports journalist and presenter, and a lead boxing presenter for Sky Sports.

Woolhouse has interviewed, among many others, world heavyweight champion Anthony Joshua following the first loss in his professional boxing career to Andy Ruiz Jnr., in 2019; and was one of the team covering the Dillian Whyte vs. Alexander Povetkin bout during the COVID-19 pandemic in 2020 at Matchroom Boxing's 'Fight Camp' alongside Johnny Nelson, Adam Smith, Tony Bellew, and Matthew Macklin.

References 

Living people
1984 births
British sports journalists
Place of birth missing (living people)
Women sports journalists